The European Women's Artistic Gymnastics Championships were first held in 1957.

Three medals are awarded: gold for first place, silver for second place, and bronze for third place. Tie breakers have not been used in every year. In the event of a tie between two gymnasts, both names are listed, and the following position (second for a tie for first, third for a tie for second) is left empty because a medal was not awarded for that position. If three gymnastics tied for a position, the following two positions are left empty.

Svetlana Khorkina, with three golds and one silver, holds the record for most medals in this event. Khorkina and Nadia Comăneci are tied for most gold medals.

Medalists

Medal table

See also
 European Men's and Women's Artistic Gymnastics Individual Championships
 European Women's Artistic Gymnastics Championships
 World Artistic Gymnastics Championships

References 

 

European Artistic Gymnastics Championships
All-around artistic gymnastics